Talking with the Taxman About Poetry is the third album by Billy Bragg, released in September 1986. With production by John Porter and Kenny Jones, Talking with the Taxman About Poetry featured more musicians than Bragg's previous works, which were generally little more than Bragg himself and a guitar.

There were two singles released from the album. While "Levi Stubbs' Tears" peaked at No. 29 in the UK, the follow-up "Greetings to the New Brunette" fell short, only managing No. 58 a few months later.

Background
The album's title is also the title of a Vladimir Mayakovsky poem, which appears as part of the liner notes.

The song "There Is Power in a Union" is based on the song "Battle Cry of Freedom".

"Levi Stubbs' Tears" refers to songwriter Barrett Strong, producer Norman Whitfield, the members of the Holland-Dozier-Holland songwriting and production team as well as Levi Stubbs and the Four Tops.

The original album cover has the subtitle "The Difficult Third Album".

Critical reception

Reviewing Talking with the Taxman About Poetry for Rolling Stone, David Handelman called the album "a winning mesh, by turns as political as the Clash, as clever as Elvis Costello, as melodic as Ray Davies and as rocking as Chuck Berry." Ira Robbins of Trouser Press praised it as "a great leap forward, the deft application of understated instrumental accompaniment on some of Bragg's best-ever songs."

Talking with the Taxman About Poetry was included in the book 1001 Albums You Must Hear Before You Die.

Track listing
All tracks written by Billy Bragg, except where noted.

Disc one
"Greetings to the New Brunette" – 3:29
"Train Train" (Zenon De Fleur) – 2:11
"The Marriage" – 2:30
"Ideology" (Bragg, Bob Dylan) – 3:27
"Levi Stubbs' Tears" – 3:28
"Honey, I'm a Big Boy Now" – 4:05
"There Is Power in a Union" (Bragg, George Frederick Root) – 2:47
"Help Save the Youth of America" – 2:45
"Wishing the Days Away" – 2:28
"The Passion" – 2:52
"The Warmest Room" – 3:55
"The Home Front" – 4:09

Disc two (2006 reissue)
"Sin City" (Gram Parsons, Chris Hillman) – 3:34
"Deportees" (Woody Guthrie, Martin Hoffman) – 4:03
"There is Power in a Union" (instrumental) (George Root) – 3:16
"The Tracks of My Tears" (Smokey Robinson, Warren Moore, Marvin Tarplin) – 2:56
"Wishing the Days Away" (alternate version) – 2:32
"The Clashing of Ideologies" (alternate version) – 2:52
"Greetings to the New Brunette" (demo version) – 3:57
"A Nurse's Life is Full of Woe" – 2:48
"Only Bad Signs" – 3:10
"Hold the Fort" (traditional) – 1:47

Personnel

Musicians
Billy Bragg – acoustic and electric guitar, vocals
Kirsty MacColl – vocals on "Greetings to the New Brunette" and "The Passion"
Ken Craddock – piano on "Honey, I'm a Big Boy Now", organ on "The Warmest Room"
Kenny Jones – assorted percussion
Johnny Marr – electric guitar on "Greetings to the New Brunette" and "The Passion"
Simon Moreton – percussion on "Greetings to the New Brunette" and "Levi Stubbs' Tears"
John Porter – bass guitar and slide guitar on "Greetings to the New Brunette", bass guitar on "The Marriage" and "The Warmest Room", mandolin on "Help Save the Youth of America" and "Wishing the Days Away"
George Shilling – assorted percussion
Bobby Valentino – violin on "Train Train" and "Wishing the Days Away"
Dave Woodhead – trumpet and flugelhorn on "The Marriage", "Levi Stubbs' Tears" and "The Home Front"
Hank Wangford – vocals and mandolin on "Sin City" and "Deportees"
Robert Handley – vocals on "Hold the Fort"

Production
Kenny Jones – producer
John Porter – producer
Grant Showbiz – reissue producer
George Shilling – technician
Pennie Smith – photography

References

External links

1986 albums
Billy Bragg albums
Albums produced by John Porter (musician)
Go! Discs albums
Cooking Vinyl albums